Josiah Judson Hazen (December 11, 1871 – October 20, 1948) was an American college football player and coach. He served as a player-coach at Williams College in 1899 and 1901, compiling a record of 15–8.  Hazen died on October 20, 1948, at Middlesex Hospital in Middletown, Connecticut.

Head coaching record

References

1871 births
1948 deaths
19th-century players of American football
Williams Ephs football coaches
Williams Ephs football players
Yale Bulldogs football players
People from Haddam, Connecticut